The Tanglewood Music Festival is a music festival held every summer on the Tanglewood estate in Stockbridge and Lenox in the Berkshire Hills in western Massachusetts.

The festival consists of a series of concerts, including symphonic music, chamber music, choral music, musical theater, contemporary music, jazz, and pop music. The Boston Symphony Orchestra is in residence at the festival, but many of the concerts are put on by other groups. It is one of the premier music festivals in the United States and one of the top in the world.

See also
Boston University Tanglewood Institute
Tanglewood Jazz Festival

References

External links
 Tanglewood Music Festival home website (BSO)

Music festivals in Massachusetts
Lenox, Massachusetts
Tourist attractions in Berkshire County, Massachusetts
Performing arts in Massachusetts
Festivals established in 1937
1937 establishments in Massachusetts